Concord Elementary School located at 2340 Brownsville Road in the Carrick neighborhood of Pittsburgh, Pennsylvania, was built in 1939.  It was designed by Marion M. Steen (1886–1966) in  Georgian Revival and Moderne style.  It was added to the List of Pittsburgh History and Landmarks Foundation Historic Landmarks in 2001, and the List of City of Pittsburgh historic designations on November 30, 1999.

References

Schools in Pittsburgh
Georgian Revival architecture in Pennsylvania
School buildings completed in 1939
Defunct schools in Pennsylvania
1939 establishments in Pennsylvania